Yancey County is a county located in the U.S. state of North Carolina. As of the 2020 census, the population was 18,470. Its county seat is Burnsville.

This land was inhabited by the Cherokee prior to European settlement, as was much of the Southern Appalachian region.

History
Independent and sturdy Scottish, English, and Scotch-Irish and Irish settlers of the Carolina frontier had crossed the Blue Ridge Mountains and settled the Toe River Valley by the mid-18th century.  In the year 1796, one of the early land speculators, John Gray Blount, paid for 326,640 acres (1322 km2) of land, a portion of which later became Yancey County, North Carolina.

In December 1833, the General Assembly established a new western county, named Yancey, from sections of Burke and Buncombe counties.  Yancey County was named in honor of Bartlett Yancey, of Caswell County.  As a U.S. Congressman (1813–1817) and as speaker of the N.C. Senate (1817–1827), he was instrumental in many accomplishments that benefited the state, including the creation of an education fund that was the beginning of the N.C. Public School System. He was an advocate of correcting the inequality in representation in the General Assembly by the creation of new western counties;
but he died on August 30, 1828, over five years before the General Assembly created a new county named in his honor. In Yancey's boundaries looms Mount Mitchell, the highest peak in the Eastern U.S., at 6,684 feet (2037 m) above sea level.

On March 6, 1834, "Yellow Jacket" John Bailey conveyed 100 acres (0.4 km2) of land for the county seat. John was given the nickname for his famous temper as told in the books The Bailey Family of Yancey County, North Carolina and Heritage of the Tow River Valley by Lloyd Richard Bailey Sr. The town was named Burnsville in honor of Captain Otway Burns, who voted for the creation of the new western county when he was serving in the General Assembly. He was also a naval hero in the War of 1812. A statue of Captain Burns stands on a 40-ton, Mount Airy granite pedestal in the center of the town's public square, which was given the official name of "Bailey Square" by the Yancey County Board of Commissioners on September 1, 1930.  The statue of Captain Burns was given to the county on July 5, 1909, by Walter Francis Burns, a grandson of the naval captain. The inscription reads:
Otway Burns - Born in Onslow County, North Carolina, 1777 - Died at Portsmouth, North Carolina, 1850.  Sailor - Soldier - Statesman.  North Carolina's Foremost Son in the War of 1812-1815 - For Him, This Town Is Named - He Guarded Well Our Seas, Let Our Mountains Honor Him.

Geography

Mount Mitchell at 6,684 feet (2,037 m), within Mount Mitchell State Park in Yancey County, is the highest point in the United States east of the Mississippi River. The Black Mountains, of which Mt. Mitchell is a part, contains five of the 10 highest peaks east of the Mississippi, all over 6,400 ft (1,951 m). In descending order of height, they are: Mount Mitchell, Mount Craig, Balsam Cone, Mount Gibbs and Potato Hill.

National protected areas 
 Blue Ridge Parkway (part)
 Pisgah National Forest (part)

State and local protected areas 
 Bare Dark Sky Observatory (part)
 Carolina Hemlocks Recreation Area
 Mt. Mitchell State Park
 Ray-Cort Recreation Park

Major water bodies 
 Big Crabtree Creek
 Big Creek
 Bowlers Creek
 Cane River
 Nolichucky River
 South Toe River

Adjacent counties
 Mitchell County - northeast
 McDowell County - southeast
 Buncombe County - southwest
 Madison County - west
 Unicoi County, Tennessee - northwest

Major highways

Demographics

2020 census

As of the 2020 United States census, there were 18,470 people, 7,510 households, and 5,081 families residing in the county.

2000 census
As of the census of 2000, there were 17,774 people, 7,472 households, and 5,372 families residing in the county. The population density was 57 people per square mile (22/km2). There were 9,729 housing units at an average density of 31 per square mile (12/km2). The racial makeup of the county was 97.99% White, 0.57% Black or African American, 0.34% Native American, 0.13% Asian, 0.41% from other races, and 0.56% from two or more races. 2.69% of the population were Hispanic or Latino of any race.

There were 7,472 households, out of which 27.30% had children under the age of 18 living with them, 61.20% were married couples living together, 7.80% had a female householder with no husband present, and 28.10% were non-families. 25.40% of all households were made up of individuals, and 12.50% had someone living alone who was 65 years of age or older. The average household size was 2.36 and the average family size was 2.81.

In the county, the population was spread out, with 21.20% under the age of 18, 7.00% from 18 to 24, 26.40% from 25 to 44, 27.10% from 45 to 64, and 18.20% who were 65 years of age or older. The median age was 42 years. For every 100 females there were 95.70 males. For every 100 females age 18 and over, there were 93.30 males.

The median income for a household in the county was $29,674, and the median income for a family was $35,879. Males had a median income of $26,800 versus $20,885 for females. The per capita income for the county was $16,335. About 10.90% of families and 15.80% of the population were below the poverty line, including 22.10% of those under age 18 and 16.30% of those age 65 or over.

Ancestry 
As of 2015 the largest self-reported ancestry groups in Yancey County, North Carolina are:

Government and politics
Yancey County is a member of the North Carolina Councils of Governments, Region D: High Country Council of Governments.

Communities

Town
 Burnsville (county seat and largest town)

Townships

 Brush Creek
 Burnsville
 Cane River
 Crabtree
 Egypt
 Green Mountain
 Jacks Creek
 Pensacola
 Price's Creek
 Ramseytown
 South Toe

Unincorporated communities

 Bald Creek
 Bent Creek
 Busick
 Cane River
 Celo
 Day Book
 Green Mountain
 Hamrick
 Micaville
 Murchison
 Newdale
 Pensacola
 Ramseytown
 Sioux
 Swiss
 Windom

See also
 List of counties in North Carolina
 National Register of Historic Places listings in Yancey County, North Carolina
 North Carolina State Parks
 National Park Service
 List of national forests of the United States
 Yancey County News
 John Wesley McElroy House
 Nu-Wray Inn
 Parkway Playhouse
 Arthur Morgan School

References

External links

 
 

 
1833 establishments in North Carolina
Populated places established in 1833
Counties of Appalachia